The round rays (Heliotrygon) is a genus of freshwater stingrays in the family Potamotrygonidae.  The genus is endemic to the Amazon basin in South America. Despite being discovered decades earlier, the genus was only scientifically described in 2011. They mainly live in deep river channels, but approach the shore at night to feed on fish.

Their discs are very circular in shape (including the snout), and they have tiny eyes and a relatively short tail with an essentially harmless, vestigial stinger (sometimes even lacking). Both species are greyish or brownish above, but while H. gomesi is overall plain without distinct markings, H. rosai has a white to creamy-white vermiculated pattern.

Species
 Heliotrygon gomesi M. R. de Carvalho & Lovejoy, 2011 (Gomes's round ray)
 Heliotrygon rosai M. R. de Carvalho & Lovejoy, 2011 (Rosa's round ray)

References 

Potamotrygonidae
Freshwater fish of Brazil
Freshwater fish of Peru
Ray genera
Freshwater fish genera